Michael Jeremy Thomas Clyde (born 22 March 1941) is an English actor and musician.  During the 1960s, he was one-half of the folk duo Chad & Jeremy (with Chad Stuart), who had little success in the UK, but were an object of interest to American audiences. He has enjoyed a long television acting career and continues to appear regularly, usually playing upper-middle class or aristocratic characters.

Early life
Clyde was born in the village of Dorney in the English county of Buckinghamshire and is the son of Lady Elizabeth Wellesley and her then-husband Thomas Clyde.

Through his maternal line, Clyde is the great-great-great-grandson of Arthur Wellesley, 1st Duke of Wellington, and is a cousin of the current Duke of Wellington.

In 1953, he participated in the coronation of Queen Elizabeth II as a Page of Honour for his grandfather and carried his grandfather's coronet during the ceremony.

Clyde was educated at two independent schools: at Ludgrove School in the civil parish of Wokingham Without, adjoining the market town of Wokingham in the English county of Berkshire, and at Eton College, followed by the University of Grenoble in France.

Career
In 1965, Clyde appeared in a stage production of The Passion Flower Hotel, a musical adaptation written by John Barry and Trevor Peacock, at the Prince of Wales Theatre in London. It also featured Jane Birkin, Francesca Annis, Pauline Collins, Nicky Henson and Bill Kenwright.

In 1969, he appeared in Conduct Unbecoming as part of the original cast, which included Paul Jones. He also travelled to the US as part of the original Broadway cast.

(The episode aired during the height of Beatlemania.) He appeared in the BBC TV adaptation of Moll Flanders in 1975, and in 1979 he played Godfried Schalcken in the BBC's television horror story Schalcken the Painter. In the late 1970s he appeared alongside Lorraine Chase in a series of television advertisements for Campari. He is perhaps best known for his portrayal of villainous Austrian Imperial Governor Hermann Gessler in the 1980s action series Crossbow, which incorporated Clyde's ability to convey evil in a distinctly aristocratic way. His other notable acting role was as Dick Spackman in the ITV sitcom Is it Legal?. Clyde also portrayed King Charles I in the BBC series By the Sword Divided (1983–85), which focused on the English Civil War (the beheading of the king is featured in the second episode of Season 2). Clyde also starred as Algernon Moncrieff in 1985 in the Great Performances production of Oscar Wilde's The Importance of Being Earnest opposite Gary Bond as Jack Worthing and Dame Wendy Hiller as Lady Bracknell. In the same year, he played the civil servant Densher in Blott on the Landscape.

In 2002, Clyde appeared in The Falklands Play (a BBC dramatisation of the Falklands War) as Sir Nicholas Henderson, the British ambassador to the United States at the time. In 2004, he appeared in the BBC drama series The Alan Clark Diaries as British Conservative politician Jonathan Aitken, and also appeared in the BBC drama series Ashes To Ashes as the Superintendent which was aired in 2008.

His film career has included roles in The Great St Trinian's Train Robbery (1966), Silver Bears (1977), North Sea Hijack (1980), Invitation to the Wedding (1983), Wilt (1990), Splitting Heirs (1993), The Musketeer (2001) and The Iron Lady (2011).

He has also acted on the radio. He portrayed the gentleman thief A. J. Raffles in the BBC radio series Raffles (1985–1993). He has also portrayed Ngaio Marsh's fictional detective Inspector Roderick Alleyn.

In 2017 he played Dennis in The Girls at the Phoenix Theatre in the West End.

Since 2018, Clyde has been performing with Peter Asher of Peter & Gordon fame.

Personal life
Clyde is the oldest of three sons born to Lady Elizabeth Clyde and Captain Thomas Clyde. His brothers are:

 Robin Clyde (19 April 1943 – 13 February 1950)
 William Jonathan Clyde (born 27 May 1949)

Clyde is divorced from Vanessa Field, whom he married in 1970 at Fifth Avenue Presbyterian Church in New York City. They have two children, Lucy and Matthew.

Partial filmography
The Dick Van Dyke Show ("The Redcoats Are Coming") (1965) – Freddy
The Patty Duke Show ("Patty Pits Wits, Two Brits Hits") (1965) – Nigel
Batman ("The Bat's Kow Tow") (1966) – himself
The Great St Trinian's Train Robbery (1966) – Monty
Laredo (“That’s Noway, Thataway“) (1966) – Newton Weeks
My Three Sons ("Liverpool Saga") (1967) – Paul Drayton
Doctor Watson and the Darkwater Hall Mystery (1974) – Miles
The Pallisers (1974) – Gerard Maule
Silver Bears (1977) – Nick Topping
Raffles (1977) – Alick Carruthers
The Duchess of Duke Street ("The Patriots") (1977) – Mr Appleby
North Sea Hijack (1979) – Tipping
Charles & Diana: A Royal Love Story (1982) – Andrew Parker Bowles
Invitation to the Wedding (1983) – Teddy Barrington
Bergerac (1986) Series 5, Episode 1: “Memory Man” – Smythe 
Wilt (1990) – Hugh
Splitting Heirs (1993) – 14th Duke
Kaspar Hauser (1993) – Lord Stanhope
Is It Legal (1995-1996) 14 episodes - Dick Spackman <ref IMDb Is it Legal - full cast and crew≥ 
The Moth (1997) – Reginald Thorman 
Midsomer Murders (1999) – Bill Mitchell - Strangler’s Wood
Bodywork (2001) – Boss
The Musketeer (2001) – Lord Buckingham
Mangal Pandey: The Rising (2005) – Hearsey
The Iron Lady (2011) – James T
Downton Abbey (2011) – General Robertson
Candle to Water (2012) – Boothy

References

External links
 
Official site of Chad Stuart & Jeremy Clyde / History

1941 births
Alumni of the Royal Central School of Speech and Drama
English folk musicians
English male singer-songwriters
English male television actors
Living people
People educated at Ludgrove School
People educated at Eton College
Grenoble Alpes University alumni
People from South Bucks District